African hairless dogs, also known as Abyssinian sand terriers, were hairless dogs from Africa. It is unknown if any examples still exist.

This breed of dog, also known as the African Sand Dog, is known for being “semi-wild” meaning they tend to follow rather than live with the cattle breeders; though they occasionally serve as valuable companions on bunting trips. Among the names of this “breed” are the words Egyptian, Abyssinian, and Zulu which simply suggests that the genes for hairlessness have appeared independently in multiple areas of the continent as a cooling system in high heat.

A number of early European accounts from Africa mention a small hairless dog. It was described as fast moving with a short, sharp bark, and it was said to be either sandy-coloured or blue-black.  Contemporary reports indicated it may or may not have had a crest of stiff hair on its head and a tuft on its tail, although photographs fail to show any hair. Three examples were brought to Britain in 1833 and were displayed at the London Zoo as Egyptian Hairless dogs; a specimen dating from 1903 is preserved at the Natural History Museum at Tring in Herefordshire, England. These accounts of the African hairless dogs suggest that they were encountered across the continent. They are believed to be extinct, although no thorough search has been conducted across Africa to confirm they no longer exist.

See also 
 American Hairless Terrier
 Argentine Pila
 Chinese Crested Dog
 Peruvian Inca Orchid
 Xoloitzcuintle

References

External links 
 

Hairless dogs
Dog breeds originating in Africa